is a Japanese politician of the Liberal Democratic Party, a member of the House of Representatives in the Diet (national legislature). A native of Miyagi Prefecture, he attended Chuo University as an undergraduate and received his master's degree from Tohoku University. He was elected to the first of his three terms in the assembly of Miyagi Prefecture in 1995 and then to the House of Representatives for the first time in 2005.

References

External links 
  

Members of the House of Representatives (Japan)
Chuo University alumni
Tohoku University alumni
Living people
1962 births
Liberal Democratic Party (Japan) politicians
21st-century Japanese politicians